Borup Island, also known as West Jensen Island, is an uninhabited island of the Lincoln Sea in Peary Land, far northern Greenland.

The island was formerly named after Danish zoologist Adolf Severin Jensen (1866 - 1953), professor at the University of Copenhagen, who had carried out extensive research on the fisheries of West Greenland, and who was a member of the committee of the 1931–34 Three-year Expedition (Treårsekspeditionen)

Geography
It is a long island off the western side of the Nansen Land Peninsula on the other side of the Thomas Thomsen Fjord, part of the De Long Fjord system. Its eastern shore forms the western side of Adolf Jensen Fjord (Qajuutaq)  beyond which lies slightly larger MacMillan Island. Smaller Hanne Island lies 3 km to the north.

See also
List of islands of Greenland

References

Uninhabited islands of Greenland